Aguacate is a village in Toledo District, Belize. Most of the inhabitants of the village speak Q’eqchi’, a Mayan language.

References

Populated places in Toledo District
Toledo West